Kabeersar is a village in Jhunjhunun, Rajasthan, India. Its population as of the 2011 census was 705.
Jhunjhunu district

Location
Jhunjhunu, Bissau, Churu, Mandawa are the nearby Cities to Kabeersar.

Demographics 
There are two parts in this village: the main village Kabeersar and Kabeersar ka baas. Only Hindu are the main part of the population of Kabeersar. Hindi and Rajasthani/Bagri language are spoken here.

Transport
By rail
Jhunjhunun and Bissau Rail Way Station are the very nearby railway stations to Kabeersar. Jhunjhunu comes within the territory of the North Western Railway. Jhunjhunu city is connected through a broadgauge line to Sikar, Rewari, and Delhi.

By road 
Kabeersar is near to city jhunjhanu, Bissau And Mandawa. Jhunjhunu is well connected by roads from all the major cities of Rajasthan. RJ-SH 8 links Jhunjhunu to Jaipur, Sikar and Luharu. RJ-SH 41 links Fatehpur to Rajgarh via Jhunjhunun

By air 
The nearest airport to Kabeersar village is Jaipur International Airport (Jaipur). Beside that, a small Air strip is also available in Jhunjhunu for small private planes landing.

Famous places near Kabeersar 
 Mahadev Mahakal Kabeersar 0 km.
 Rani Sati Temple 3.6 km.
 Neelkanth Mahadev Bissau, Rajasthan 18 km.
 Mandawa 18 km.
 Shree RaiMata Mandir Gangiyasar 12 km.

References

Cities and towns in Jhunjhunu district